My Lover, Madame Butterfly is a South Korean romantic comedy television series starring Yum Jung-ah, Park Yong-woo, Kim Sung-soo, and Yoon Se-ah. It aired on SBS from October 16, 2012 to April 7, 2013 on Saturdays and Sundays at 20:40 for 51 episodes.

Plot
Nam Na-bi (nabi means "butterfly" in Korean) was once a top star, whose less-than-stellar acting ability was overlooked thanks to her beauty and killer fashion sense, which afforded her immense popularity. However, the tide started to change when she got caught up in numerous incidents damaging her image. Stories of her haughtiness, vanity, rude speech, and difficulty spread and she lost all that favor and became infamous instead. The drama begins as Na-bi embarks on a new phase of her life after fame, fortune, and anti-fans: marriage. As a new bride to a mysterious husband, she moves in with her in-laws and becomes part of their family, where a new set of troubles and life lessons await her.

Cast

Main characters
Yum Jung-ah as Nam Na-bi
Park Yong-woo as Lee Woo-jae
Kim Sung-soo as Kim Jung-wook
Yoon Se-ah as Yoon Seol-ah

Supporting characters
Meji Beans Restaurant family
Kim Young-ae as Lee Jung-ae
Jang Yong as Kim Byung-ho
Lee Bo-hee as Bae Shin-ja
Kim Jung-hyun as Kim Chan-ki
Cha Soo-yeon as Mok Soo-jung
Kim Young-ok as Yoo Geum-dan
Jung Hye-sun as Namgoong maknae
Choi Min as Kim Baek-ki
Kim Joon-hyung as Lee Gook-hee
Kim Ga-eun as Kim Sal-goo

Chairman Lee's family
Kim Sung-kyum as Lee Sam-goo
Kim Il-woo as Lee Sung-ryong
Im Sung-min as Hong Mo-ran
Lee Dae-hyun as Lee Yoon

Extended cast
Lee Hee-jin as Yeon Ji-yeon
Park Tam-hee as Lee Yoo-jin
Lee Hye-sook as Sylvia Choi
Jo Soo-jung as store staff
Ra Yong as Hong Seo-joon

Cameos
Jo Jae-yoon as police officer Kyung-chal
Yoo Hyung-kwan as PD Yoon Jae-ho
Lee Jung-hun as Moon Hyung-shik
Park Seul-gi
Lee Doo-il 
Kim Dong-gyun
Shin So-yul as girl on matseon ("matchmaking date")

References

External links
 

Seoul Broadcasting System television dramas
2012 South Korean television series debuts
2013 South Korean television series endings
Korean-language television shows
South Korean romantic comedy television series
Television series by Pan Entertainment